Suzanne Yenger (née Peck; August 5, 1938 – February 12, 2022) was an American politician from the state of Iowa who served as a Republican in the Iowa Senate for Ottumwa's 45th Senatorial District from 1979 to 1983.

Personal life
Yenger was born in Ottumwa, Wapello County, Iowa in 1938 to Bernice and James F. Peck. She graduated from Ottumwa High School in 1956, then attended Ottumwa Heights College to 1958, and finally Parsons College to 1961, where she received her B B.A. Yenger worked in Iowa's educational system until her retirement. She wed in 1959 and had two children. Yenger died on February 12, 2022.

Electoral history

1978

1982

Notes

References

1938 births
2022 deaths
Republican Party Iowa state senators
People from Wapello County, Iowa